Saint-Jean-de-Daye is a commune in the Manche department in Normandy in north-western France.

History
In 1839, Saint-Jean-de-Daye, having recorded just 352 registered inhabitants in 1836, absorbed the adjacent Le Mesnil-Véneron commune of 200 people. However, the ensuing decade saw economic and demographic growth and in 1847 Le Mesnil-Véneron was reinstated as a separate commune.

See also
Communes of the Manche department

References

Saintjeandedaye